Golubaya Krinitsa is a rural locality (a khutor) in Novokalitvenskoye Rural Settlement, Rossoshansky District, Voronezh Oblast, Russia. The population was 138 as of 2010. There are 2 streets.

Geography 
Golubaya Krinitsa is located 53 km southeast of Rossosh (the district's administrative centre) by road. Novaya Kalitva is the nearest rural locality.

References 

Rural localities in Rossoshansky District